The tenth season of the American television series Whose Line Is It Anyway? premiered on The CW on March 21, 2014, and concluded on November 21, 2014.

Cast

Recurring 
 Ryan Stiles  (22 episodes)
 Jeff Davis (six episodes)
 Gary Anthony Williams (five episodes)
 Greg Proops (four episodes)
 Heather Anne Campbell (three episodes)
 Keegan-Michael Key (two episodes)
 Nyima Funk (two episodes)
 Jonathan Mangum (two episodes)
 Brad Sherwood (two episodes)

Episodes 

"Winner(s)" of each episode as chosen by host Aisha Tyler are highlighted in italics. The winner(s) perform a sketch during the credit roll, just like in the original UK series.

References

External links
Whose Line Is It Anyway? (U.S.) (a Titles & Air Dates Guide)
Mark's guide to Whose Line is it Anyway? - Episode Guide

Whose Line Is It Anyway?
2014 American television seasons